This article lists events from the year 2005 in France.

Incumbents
 President: Jacques Chirac
 Prime Minister: Jean-Pierre Raffarin (until 31 May), Dominique de Villepin (starting 31 May)

Events
5 January – Libération journalist Florence Aubenas and her Iraqi guide Hussein Hanoun Al-Saadi are taken hostage in Iraq (freed on 11 June).
11 February – André Vingt-Trois is named Archbishop of Paris.
23 February – A controversial French law on colonialism, requiring teachers to paint it in a positive light, is passed by the national legislature.
25 February – Resignation of Minister of Finance Hervé Gaymard, following a scandal over the low rent of the exclusive apartment he occupied.
March – The Renault Laguna gets facelifted.
31 March – An amendment to the 35-hour workweek law is voted, extending possibilities of overtime.
April – The Fillon law reforming France's education system is voted, amidst student protests numbering hundreds of thousands.
6 April – First mental 13th root calculation of a 200-digit number, computed by Alexis Lemaire.
15 April – 2005 Paris fires – 24 people are killed and around 50 are injured in a fire at a hotel in central Paris.
27 April – First flight of Airbus A380 in Toulouse.
28 April – Sales begin of the Peugeot 1007 mini MPV.
16 May – Pentecost Monday ceases to be a statutory holiday, leading to strong protests.
19 May – Vélo'v bicycle-sharing system introduced in Lyon.
29 May – French referendum on the European Constitution votes resoundingly to reject it.
31 May – A new government, headed by Dominique de Villepin, is nominated.
June – The Peugeot 307 gets facelifted.
28 June – Official announcement that ITER will be built in Cadarache, Southern France.
5 July – Laurence Parisot becomes the president of the Mouvement des Entreprises de France.
2 August – Air France Flight 358 bursts into flames after skidding off the end of runway in Toronto, all passengers survive.
11 August – Ariane 5GS launches Thaïcom-4/iPStar-1, the heaviest telecommunications satellite to date at 6505 kg, into orbit.
16 August – West Caribbean Airways Flight 708 crashes in Venezuela, killing 160, mostly French citizens from Martinique.
16 August – Assassination of Frère Roger, founder of the Taizé community.
September – New Renault Clio is launched at the Frankfurt Motor Show.
3 September – Jacques Chirac is hospitalized for a "small vascular incident" affecting his eyesight.
27 October – 2005 civil unrest in France begins, and will last until 17 November.
November – The Renault Clio is voted European Car of the Year.
8 November – President Jacques Chirac declares a state of emergency on the 12th day of the French civil unrest.
16 November – Ariane 5 launches Spaceway-F2 and Telkom-2, the rocket's heaviest dual payload to date, at more than 8000 kg.
18 November – Partial privatization of Électricité de France.
27 November – Surgeons in France carry out the first human face transplant on Isabelle Dinoire.

Births

Full date unknown
 Bébé Lilly, animated baby girl singer

Deaths

January to March
3 January – Claude Meillassoux, economic anthropologist and Africanist (born 1925).
5 January – René Le Hénaff, film editor and director (born 1901).
7 January – Pierre Daninos, writer and humorist (born 1913).
8 January – Jacqueline Joubert, television presenter (born 1921).
8 January – Michel Thomas, linguist, language teacher and decorated war veteran (born 1914).
10 January – Georges Bernier, also known as Le Professeur Choron, humorist (born 1929).
11 January – Fernand Cazenave, international rugby union player and coach (born 1924).
15 January – Michel Moine, journalist and parapsychologist (born 1920).
27 January – Aurélie Nemours, painter (born 1910).
28 January
Jacques Villeret, actor (born 1951).
Karen Lancaume, adult film star (born 1973).
February – Madeleine Giteau, historian (born 1918).
6 February – Hubert Curien, physicist (born 1924).
7 February
Madeleine Rebérioux, historian (born 1920).
Paul Rebeyrolle, painter (born 1926).
10 February 
Humbert Balsan, film producer (born 1954).
Jean Cayrol, poet and publisher (born 1911).
11 February – Raymond Hermantier, actor (born 1924).
13 February – Maurice Trintignant, motor racing driver (born 1917).
15 February – Pierre Bachelet, singer songwriter (born 1944).
22 February – Simone Simon, actress (born 1910).
25 February – Jean Prat, international rugby player (born 1923).
1 March – Edouard Stern, banker (born 1954).
15 March – Jean-Pierre Genet, cyclist (born 1940).

April to June
8 April – Maurice Lafont, international soccer player (born 1927).
11 April
André François, cartoonist (born 1915).
Lucien Laurent, international soccer player, scored the first ever World Cup goal (born 1907).
3 May – Pierre Moerlen, drummer and percussionist (born 1952).
5 May – Claude Julien, journalist and editor (born 1925).
13 May – Eddie Barclay, music producer (born 1921).
20 May – Paul Ricœur, philosopher (born 1913).
29 June – François-Xavier Verschave, one of founders of the NGO Survie (born 1945).

July to September
2 July – Pierre Michelot, double bass player (born 1928).
6 July – Claude Simon, novelist, 1985 Nobel Laureate in Literature (born 1913).
8 July – Laurent-Michel Vacher, philosopher, writer and journalist (born 1944).
19 July 
Alain Bombard, biologist, physician, politician and sailor (born 1924).
Jean-Michel Gaillard, politician (born 1946).
26 July – Pierre Broué, historian and Trotskyist (born 1926).
28 July – Jacques Lacarrière, ice hockey player (born 1906).
3 August – Françoise d'Eaubonne, feminist writer (born 1920).
7 August – Paul Arnaud de Foïard, General (born 1921).
9 August 
Colette Besson, Olympic athlete (born 1946).
François Dalle, businessman
16 August – Frère Roger, founder of the Taizé community (born 1915).
22 August 
Henri Genès, actor and singer (born 1919).
Luc Ferrari, composer (born 1929).
25 August – Jacques Dufilho, actor (born 1914).
31 August
Stéphane Bruey, international soccer player (born 1932).
André Debry, one of the last surviving French veterans of World War I (born 1898).
9 September – André Pousse, actor (born 1919).
17 September – Jacques Lacarrière, writer, critic, journalist, and essayist (born 1925).
24 September – André Testut, motor racing driver (born 1926).

October to December
5 October – Alexis Tendil, World War I veteran (born 1896).
17 October – Jean Lescure, poet (born 1912).
25 October – Arman, artist (born 1928).
27 October
Jean-Claude Irvoas, murder victim (born 1949).
28 October – Raymond Hains, artist and photographer (born 1926).
7 November – Jean-Jacques Le Chenadec, urban violence victim (born 1944).
9 November 
Jean Catoire, composer (born 1923).
Marceau Somerlinck, soccer player (born 1922).
November – Dominique Chaboche, politician and MEP (born 1937).
4 December – Gloria Lasso, singer (born 1922).
17 December – Jacques Fouroux, international rugby union player, coach (born 1947).

Full date unknown
Ernestine Chassebœuf, letter writer (born 1910).

References

Links

2000s in France